Stardust Speed Club is an Inline speed skating team based out of Tampa, Florida and Greenacres, Florida. Stardust Speed Team is one of the oldest teams in the USA originating in 1978 started by Bob Trosky in Tampa, Florida. Stardust joined with the West Palm (Green Acres) Team in 1985-1986. The official Stardust Colors are Navy Blue, Baby Blue and White. They are an officially sanctioned team with USA Roller Sports.

Locations 
 Tampa, Florida
 Greenacres, Florida

Coaches 
 Coach (Tampa) - Sammy Johnson
 Coach (Tampa) - Joe Hanna
 Coach (Tampa) - Roy Paz
 Coach (Greenacres) - Ed Mueller
 Coach (Greenacres) - Ross Vening
 Coach (Tampa) - Eric Licata

See also 
Team Florida

External links 
 Stardust Greenacres Official Website
 Stardust Tampa Official Website

Roller skating organizations
Sports teams in Florida
Inline skating
1978 establishments in Florida
Sports in Tampa, Florida
Sports clubs established in 1978